Zvishavane District is one of the eight districts in Midlands Province of Zimbabwe.

It has Mberengwa District to the south and Shurugwi District to the north.

Its capital is Zvishavane town.

Economy

Zvishavane District is home of Zvishavane Town which developed from an asbestos mine compound into a town.
See Shabanie Mashaba Mine.

It is also home to Murowa Diamond Mine located in Mazvihwa, 40 km
from Zvishavane Town.

Local government

Zvishavane District is run by two local government organs, the rural district council and the urban council.

For the rural district authority see Runde Rural District Council.

The Zvishavane Town Council, established in terms of the Zimbabwe Urban Councils Act, Chapter 29.15, administers the urban district.

2013 - 2018 Council

Source: Zimbabwe Electoral Commission

2008 - 2013 Town Council

Source: Kubatana Aechive

See also

 Runde RDC 
 Tongogara RDC 
 Mutumwa Mawere 
 Murowa 
 Mashava

References

 
Districts of Midlands Province